Kambera, also known as East Sumbanese, is a Malayo-Polynesian language spoken in the Lesser Sunda Islands, Indonesia. Kambera is a member of Bima-Sumba subgrouping within Central Malayo-Polynesian inside Malayo-Polynesian. The island of Sumba, located in Eastern Indonesia, has an area of 12,297 km2. The name Kambera comes from a traditional region which is close to a town in Waingapu. Because of export trades which concentrated in Waingapu in the 19th century, the language of the Kambera region has become the bridging language in eastern Sumba.

Phonology

Vowels

Consonants

Morpho-syntax

Negation
Negators are used in Kambera, and other languages, to make a clause or sentence negative in meaning. Kambera has several types of negators. There are six main types of negators listed below. 

 is used to express future negation, as well as negation in imperatives.

Negators are elements in a clause that are deictic. They can be used to refer to time, space and discourse. Shown below, the negator, is used to refer to discourse.

Two of these negators,  and  – with  being a general negator, are used for nominal and verbal predicates.

Negators into verbs 
The word  in Kambera is derivational and can be added to few prepositional nouns, numerals and negators to create verbs. The emphatic negator  'no' can become a verb through  derivation. The translation of this verb then becomes 'to deny'.

Example below of how  is constructed into a verb in a given phrase:

Noun phrases 
A nuclear clause has the predicate as the head in Kambera, and modifiers are positioned at the beginning of the clause. As  is a modifier it is placed at the beginning of a clause, as a clause-initial negator, before the verb and the rest of the elements of a nuclear clause.

You can distinguish nominal clauses from NPs is through the irrealis negator  and the negator , which both never occur inside a possessed NP.

Clitics
The Kambera word  is also considered to be a pro-clitic as well, as they do not conform to the minimal word requirement and must occur with a syntactic/phonological host. A clitic is a type of bound morpheme which is syntactically free, but are phonologically bound morphemes. They can attach themselves to a stem, for example the negator .  appears before its host and is used to mark negation. It has a very simple phonotactic properties and cannot carry stress.  as a clitic can only ever occur with a host. 

In the example above, the negator  becomes  , with  attaching itself to the allomorph .  is a proclitic that marks an embedded clause in Kambera.

Relative clauses 
Negators are also included in relative clauses, but are not a part of the noun phrase.

Pronouns and person markers 
Personal pronouns are used in Kambera for emphasis/disambiguation and the syntactic relation between full pronouns and clitics is similar to that between NPs and clitics. NPs and pronouns have morphological case.

Kambera, as a head-marking language, has rich morpho-syntactic marking on its predicators. The pronominal, aspectual and/or mood clitics together with the predicate constitute the nuclear clause. Definite verbal arguments are crossreferenced on the predicate for person, number and case (Nominative (N), Gentive (G), Dative (D), Accusative (A)). The four main pronominal clitic paradigms are given below.

Examples:

The items in the table below mark person and number of the subject when the clause has continuative aspect.

Examples:

Possession 
Kambera has a possessive or reflexive noun  'self/own', which can be used to mark possession (1). 

 has the structural properties of a noun and can be used as a nominal modifier (compare 2 and 3), unlike pronouns which must be cross-referenced on the noun with a genitive clitic (3).

As (3) is a possessed noun phrase, the enclitic attaches to the noun. In possessed and modified noun phrases, the genitive enclitic attaches to the noun modifier (4).

In Kambera, where cross-referencing is used, the noun phrase is optional. A verb along with its pronominal markers constitutes a complete sentence. Pronominal clitics are a morphological way of expressing relationships between syntactic constituents such as a noun and its possessor.

Possessor relativisation 
Possessors can be relativised with a  relative clause. There are three types of clauses used in the relativisation of possessors.

The first is when the embedded verb is derived from a relational noun such as mother or child. These derived transitive verbs express relations between the subject and the object (5).

The second clause type is where the possessor is the head of the ma- relative clause and the possessee is the subject of the embedded verb (6).

The final type is where the relative clause contains the verb  'be' and the incorporated argument of this verb. The head of the relative construction is the possessor (7).

Normally, the possessor pronoun  'he/she' follows the possessed noun (8), though it can also be the head of a relativised clause (9).

Possessors can also be relativised in the same way as subjects. For example, in the following headless relative clause (no possessor NP is present), a definite article is present (10).

Abbreviations

Footnotes

Bibliography
 
 

Sumba languages
Languages of Indonesia